Chiloglottis longiclavata, commonly known as the northern wasp orchid, is a species of orchid endemic to Queensland. It has two leaves and a single narrow, pinkish green flower with a dark blackish red callus covering most of the upper surface of the labellum .

Description
Most of the upper surface of the labellum is covered by a dark blackish red, insect-like callus of stalked and clusters of stalkless glands. Flowering occurs from February to May.

Taxonomy and naming
Chiloglottis longiclavata was first formally described in 1991 by David Jones from a specimen collected in the Herberton Range and the description was published in Australian Orchid Research. The specific epithet (longiclavata) is derived from the Latin words longus meaning "long" and clavus meaning "club" or "cudgel" referring to the glandular tips on the sepals of this species.

Distribution and habitat
The northern wasp orchid grows in small colonies in tall forests and near rainforest margins on and between the Atherton Tableland and Eungella National Park. On the summit of Mount Bartle Frere it grows in stunted heath.

References

External links 

longiclavata
Orchids of Queensland
Flora of Queensland
Plants described in 1991